Cernin may refer to:

Černín, a municipality and village in the Czech Republic
Czernin family (Černín family), a Czech noble family
Saturnin, saint, also called Cernín in Spanish